Philipp Kochner (born 22 May 1993) is a German footballer who plays for SV Schalding-Heining.

External links

1993 births
Living people
German footballers
SV Wacker Burghausen players
3. Liga players
Regionalliga players
Association football midfielders
Footballers from Munich